Kelvin Ngozi Ikeduba (born 21 August 1976) is a Nigerian actor who in 2014 won the award for Best Cross Over Actor at the Yoruba Movie Academy Awards (YMAA) and he is predominantly known for his diversity in the Nigerian movie industry as he has been featured in Nollywood movies where the English language is commonly used in their productions and also has been featured in diverse Yoruba only speaking movies produced by the Yoruba movie industry of Nigeria.

Early life 
Ikeduba although being a native of Delta State was born in Ebute-Meta in Lagos State a south-western geopolitical zone of Nigeria predominantly occupied by the Yoruba-speaking people of Nigeria and is from a family of six—four children, two male, two female, a mother, and a father—of which he is the first born child. Ikeduba was raised from a tender age into adulthood in Lagos state, precisely in Olokodana Street in Ebute-Metta.

Education 
Ikeduba received both primary and secondary school education in Lagos State but in bid to obtain a university degree he relocated to the Benin city, a south-south geopolitical zone of Nigeria where he applied to the University of Benin to study Economics. Ikeduba was accepted and eventually graduated from there with a B.Sc. degree in Economics.

Career
In an interview with Vanguard, a Nigerian print media press, Ikeduba stated that he debuted in the Nigerian movie industry in the year 2000. He described his venture into the Nigerian movie industry as a coincidence as he initially only wanted to accompany a friend to an audition for actors but on reaching their destination he decided to audition also and was successful in it as he was called back and given a movie role. Ikeduba’s ability to understand and communicate in all three major languages in Nigeria has been pivotal to his career, he acknowledges this fact and speaks publicly about it. Ikeduba debuted his acting career into the English language only conventional and mainstream Nigerian movie industry known commonly as Nollywood but eventually crossed over to the Yoruba movie industry in Nigeria with the help of Femi Ogedengbe who introduced him to Saheed Balogun who gave him a movie role in a Yoruba movie he was producing titled Omo Alhaja.

Ikeduba has been stereotyped in the Nigerian movie industry as a “Bad Boy” which he attributed to his appearance, hence in almost all the movies he has featured in, he was always the antagonist or as the Nigerian media puts it “The Bad Boy”.

Awards

Personal life
Ikeduba is multilingual as he can speak the Yoruba language, the Hausa Language the Igbo language as well as the English language, which is the official language of communication in Nigeria.

Selected filmography
Son of Mercy (2020)
Edo Decree 1440 (2018)
Igbeyawo Arugbo (2010)
Owowunmi (2010)
Atunida Leyi (2009)
Esin Obinrin (2009)
Critical Truth (2008) as Emeka
Kiss The Dust (2008) as Baba Books
Laroda Ojo (2008) as Shola
Mafi Wonmi (2008)
My Darling Princess (2008)
Ghetto Queen (2007)
Ghetto Language (2006)
Last Dance (2006)
Under The Sky (2006)
More Than Gold (2005)
Ògìdán (2004)
Emotional Tears (2003)
The Suitors (2000)
Lucifer (2019)

References

External links
IMDb Page Of Kelvin Ikeduba

Living people
Nigerian male film actors
21st-century Nigerian male actors
Igbo male actors
Male actors in Yoruba cinema
1976 births
Male actors from Lagos
University of Benin (Nigeria) alumni
Yoruba actors
Nigerian male television actors
Actors from Delta State